Ashton Sautner (born May 27, 1994) is a Canadian professional ice hockey defenceman. He is currently playing for the Manitoba Moose in the American Hockey League (AHL) while under contract with the Winnipeg Jets of the National Hockey League (NHL).

Playing career
Sautner was selected by the Edmonton Oil Kings in the eighth round (162nd overall) of the 2009 WHL Bantam Draft. During the 2013–14 season, Sautner's plus/minus record was the best in the WHL.

Sautner went to the Minnesota Wild prospect camp prior to the 2012-13 season. He attended the Arizona Coyotes prospect camp in the 2014 pre-season. During his fourth season with the Oil Kings, despite being undrafted, Sautner was signed to a three-year entry level contract with the Vancouver Canucks on March 14, 2015. On March 24, 2018, the Canucks recalled Sautner on an emergency basis. He made his NHL debut the following night, a 4–1 Canucks victory over the Dallas Stars. Three games later, on March 31 against the Columbus Blue Jackets, Sautner earned his first NHL point, an assist on a Darren Archibald goal.

Sautner began the 2018–19 season with the Utica Comets in the AHL after clearing waivers. On February 19, he was recalled to the NHL for the first time that season.

After attending the Canucks training camp for the pandemic delayed 2020–21 season, Sautner was initially assigned to the Utica Comets. On January 20, 2021, Sautner was re-assigned by the Canucks to the Winnipeg Jets AHL affiliate, the Manitoba Moose, due to shorter quarantine recall regulations.

Following his sixth season under contract with the Vancouver Canucks, Sautner as a free agent opted to continue within the organization, signing a one-year AHL contract with inaugural affiliate, the Abbotsford Canucks, on August 13, 2021. In the  season, Sautner added 1 assist through 18 games with Abbotsford before he was signed to a one-year, two-way NHL contract with the Canucks on December 18, 2021.

On July 15, 2022, Sautner as a free agent was signed to a one-year, two-way contract with the Winnipeg Jets.

Career statistics

Awards and honours

References

External links 

Unrestricted Free Agent Signing https://www.tsn.ca/nhl/free-agency

1994 births
Living people
Abbotsford Canucks players
Canadian ice hockey defencemen
Ice hockey people from Manitoba
Edmonton Oil Kings players
Manitoba Moose players
People from Wolseley, Saskatchewan
Undrafted National Hockey League players
Utica Comets players
Vancouver Canucks players